Sandoa is a city in the Lualaba province of the Democratic Republic of the Congo. As of 2012, it had an estimated population of 10,208.

References 

Populated places in Lualaba Province